Nabulsi soap (ṣābūn Nābulsi) is a type of castile soap produced only in Nablus in the West Bank, Palestine. Its chief ingredients are virgin olive oil (the main agricultural product of the region), water, and an alkaline sodium compound. The finished product is ivory-colored and has almost no scent. Traditionally made by women for household use, it had become a significant industry for Nablus by the 14th century. In 1907 the city's 30 Nabulsi soap factories were supplying half the soap in Palestine. The industry declined during the mid-20th century following the destruction caused by the 1927 Jericho earthquake and later disruption from the Israeli military occupation. As of 2008, only two soap factories survive in Nablus. The old Arafat soap factory has been turned into a Cultural Heritage Enrichment Center.

History

Nabulsi soap was traditionally made by women for household use, even before the appearance of small soap-making factories in the 10th century. Trade with Bedouins was indispensable for soap-making, both in Nablus and Hebron, since they alone could furnish the alkaline soda (qilw) required by the process. By the 14th century a significant soap-making industry had developed in Nablus and the soap, reputedly prized by Queen Elizabeth I of England, was exported throughout the Middle East and to Europe.

The 19th century saw a major expansion of soap manufacturing in Nablus, which became the center of soap production throughout the Fertile Crescent. By 1907, the city's 30 factories were producing nearly 5,000 tons of Nabulsi soap annually, over half of all soap production in Palestine. John Bowring wrote of Nabulsi soap in the 1830s that it was "highly esteemed in the Levant," and Muhammad Kurd Ali, a Syrian historian, wrote in the 1930s that "Nablus soap is the best and most famous soap today for it has, it seems, a quality not found in others and the secret is that it is unadulterated and well produced."

The soap industry in Nablus began to decline in the mid-20th century, caused in part by natural disasters, especially a 1927 earthquake, which destroyed much of the Old City of Nablus, and in part by Israeli military occupation. Israeli military raids during the Second Intifada destroyed several soap factories in the historic quarter of Nablus. Several soap factories remain in Nablus; currently, products are sold primarily in Palestine and the Arab countries, with some fair-trade exports to Europe and beyond. On the continuing problems both in terms of the soap's manufacture and its export, the General Manager of the factory owned by the Touqan family commented in 2008:

Before 2000, our factory used to produce 600 tons of soap annually. Due to the physical and economic obstacles we face now because of the Israeli occupation – and especially the checkpoints – we produce barely half that amount today.

According to the United Nations Office for the Coordination of Humanitarian Affairs, the checkpoints and roadblocks set up throughout the West Bank have created problems in the transportation of supplies and material to and from the factories as well as making it difficult for workers to get from their homes to the factories.  However, Nabulsi soap is still widely sold in Nablus and the West Bank. It is also exported to Jordan, Kuwait, and Arab-Israeli cities such as Nazareth.

Considered an important aspect of Nablus's cultural heritage, the preservation of the Nabulsi soap-making industry has been the focus of several local projects, including the restoration and conversion of the old Arafat soap factory into a Cultural Heritage Enrichment Center. The center has research and exhibition facilities and includes a small model soap factory that makes Nabulsi soap using traditional methods. Project Hope and other local non-governmental organizations market the soap in the West to raise funds for their other community projects.

Production process
Like Castile soap, the chief ingredients of Nabulsi soap are virgin olive oil, water, and an alkaline sodium compound. The compound is made by mixing the powdered ashes of the barilla plant (qilw), which grows along the banks of the River Jordan, with locally supplied lime (sheed). The sodium compound is then heated with water and olive oil in large copper vats over fermentation pits. The solution of water and sodium compound becomes increasingly concentrated in a series of 40 cycles repeated over eight days. During that time, an oar-shaped wooden tool known as a dukshab is used to stir the liquid soap continuously. The liquid soap is then spread in wooden frames to set. After setting, it is cut into the classic cube shape of Nabulsi soap and stamped with the company's trademark seal. The soap cubes then undergo a drying process that can last from three months to a year and involves stacking them in ceiling-high structures resembling cones with hollow centers that allow the air to circulate around them.

The finished product is ivory-colored and has almost no scent. (Perfumes are never used in Nabulsi soap.) Before leaving the factory, the individual cubes that are to be sold locally are wrapped by hand in paper that is waxed on one side. Cubes that are destined for export are left unwrapped and usually dispatched in stiff sacks to protect them from damage.

Gallery

See also
African black soap
Aleppo soap
Castile soap
Marseille soap
Palestinian handicrafts
Vegan soap

References

Bibliography

External links
Nabulsi Soap - Nablus The Culture
Witness, A documentary that profiles 3 businesses in Nablus, including one of the two remaining Nabulsi soap makers.

10th-century establishments in Asia
Economy of the State of Palestine
Nablus
Palestinian handicrafts
Soaps
Arab culture
Palestinian inventions